Jennifer Hodson (born 12 September 1979 in Creighton, KwaZulu–Natal) is a South African sprint canoer who competed in the late 2000s. At the 2008 Summer Olympics in Beijing, she finished seventh in the K-4 500 m event and eighth in the K-1 500 m event.

References
 Sports-Reference.com profile

1979 births
Living people
People from Ingwe Local Municipality
White South African people
Canoeists at the 2008 Summer Olympics
Olympic canoeists of South Africa
South African female canoeists